Daniel Fitzgerald Runde (born January 21, 1972) is a senior executive, strategist and expert in international development, international trade, investment, global business and organizational change who builds dynamic partnership alliances among governments, multi-lateral institutions, corporations, and philanthropies. Runde is the author of the acclaimed book, "The American Imperative: Reclaiming Global Leadership through Soft Power."

Currently, Runde is the senior vice president at the Center for Strategic and International Studies (CSIS) and holds the William A. Schreyer Chair in Global Analysis. He is also the director of the Project on Prosperity and Development and leads CSIS work in the Americas region. 

He has advised several governments, including the United States, Japan, Australia, Canada, South Korea and Denmark as well as the World Bank and United Nations, on development policy. He was an architect of the BUILD Act which led to a major reform of the Overseas Private Investment Corporation (OPIC) and created the US Development Finance Corporation (DFS).  He testified before the U.S. Senate and the House of Representatives related to the BUILD Act.  He was consulted extensively by the U.S. government in the preparation of PROSPER Africa-an initiative to deeper trade and development ties between the United States and Africa.  In 2018, Runde created a series of analyses at the request of the U.S. Treasury around options for a potential World Bank capital increase.  The U.S. Treasury used this research to determine the U.S. negotiating position as part of this capital increase.  In 2017, Runde convened a bipartisan Task Force on the Future of U.S. Foreign Assistance in the context of a major review by the U.S. government of its foreign aid.  The Task Force persuaded the U.S. Government to maintain the U.S. Agency for International Development as an independent agency. 

Mr. Runde has played a key role in the election of several key multilateral posts starting in 2018. In 2018, Runde was an early and vocal supporter of David Malpass for President of the World Bank when other voices were silent.  In 2019 and 2020, Runde played a pivotal role in bringing about a US consensus on supporting Mr. Darren Tang as Director General of the World Intellectual Property Organization.  The WIPO election of 2020 pitted a qualified Chinese candidate (Wang Binying) versus an OECD supported candidate.  Runde’s work educating stakeholders on the stakes, convening a series of key meetings ensured Mr. Tang enjoyed strong US support.  Runde also played a significant role in the election of Matias Cormann as Secretary-General of the OECD in 2021.  In 2011, he played a central role in persuading the United States Congress to renew U.S. support for the World Bank and other multi-lateral banks. Runde has developed, led, and managed outreach efforts to successfully position the International Finance Corporation (IFC) as a partner of choice for private and corporate philanthropy.

Runde has worked in various capacities with the U.S. Agency for International Development (USAID) where he managed a $20 million annual budget for partnership activities internationally. He has represented the U.S. to senior leaders of foreign governments, corporations, and foundations. Runde led the Global Development Alliance initiative by providing training, networks, staff, funds, and advice to establish and strengthen alliances while personally consulting to 15 USAID missions in Latin America, the Middle East, and Africa. His efforts leveraged $4.8 billion through 100 direct alliances and 300 others through training and technical assistance.

In 2010, Runde was named one of “40 under 40 in International Development in Washington” by the Devex Group. Runde was also awarded the Order of Isabella the Catholic (Orden de Isabel la Católica) by the Spanish Government in 2017 for his sustained defense over a number of year in favor of Spanish unity.

Career

Early years (1994-2002)
Runde began his career in financial services and corporate finance at Alex. Brown and Sons (now part of Deutsche Bank) in Baltimore, Maryland from 1994 to 1996. Between 1999 and 2000, Runde worked in Argentina as a consultant to corporation foundation of BankBoston. Later, from 2000 to 2002, he worked as an assistant vice president for commercial banking at Citibank in Buenos Aires.

Bush Administration (2002-2007)
Runde joined the USAID in 2002, under the Bush Administration, during the early stages of the Global Development Alliance initiative. From 2005 to 2007, he headed the Office of Global Development Alliances (GDA) as the director. At the USAID, he led the GDA partnership initiative by providing training, networks, staff, funds, and advice to establish and strengthen alliances. Under Runde, the GDA initiative was recognized by Harvard University as a runner-up for the Innovations in Government Award. Runde stated that public-private alliances were key to the success leading to this award. He is quoted in the report on public-private alliances that the GDA put out on exactly this matter. The Journal for the Organisation for Economic Co-operation and Development, the OECD Observer, also utilized Runde to explain this idea to its readers.

World Bank (2007-2010)
In 2007, Runde joined the private-sector arm of the World Bank Group, the IFC, where he was the head of the Foundations Unit for the Department of Partnerships and Advisory Service Operations. In this role, he successfully positioned IFC as a partner of choice for private and corporate philanthropy. Runde was also responsible for leading IFC’s relations with senior policymakers throughout the U.S. government.

CSIS (2010-present)
Runde joined CSIS in 2010, where he currently holds the William A. Schreyer Chair in Global Analysis. In addition to that, he leads the Project on Prosperity and Development and the Project on U.S. Leadership in Development as its director, where he focuses on private enterprise development, the role of private actors in development (philanthropy, business, diasporas, and others), and the researches the role of emerging donors, such as the members of the G20. 

Runde’s contributions at the CSIS were an important factor in the World Bank President’s decision to retain the Doing Business Index in 2013, a central pillar of the World Bank’s work.

Role in policy design
Runde has been a long-standing member of the board of directors for the Society for International Development-Washington (SIDW) and served as its president between 2011 and 2012. He also served as chair of the July 2011 SID World Congress in Washington, DC.  Runde is also a life member of the Council of Foreign Relations. 

As an expert on international political affairs, and a staunch advocate of American leadership in global economic development, Runde has significantly contributed and discussed these issues through Forbes and Foreign Policy, and has also been quoted in Bloomberg, the Financial Times, Politico, and NPR. He writes and speaks extensively on global development and U.S. foreign policy at symposia including the World Economic Forum for which he also serves as a member of its Global Agenda Council on the United States.

At CSIS, Runde has hosted several public and private discussions that sought to influence governments (both the United States and foreign) on various policy issues, including general capital increases for multilateral institutions, reorganization of the State Department and USAID and ongoing development projects such as Power Africa.

Runde’s role in policy design also includes public testimonies to national legislative bodies. In October 2011, Runde testified before the House Committee on Financial Services committee, subcommittee on International Monetary Policy and Trade to speak about the role of multilateral institutions. Additionally, Runde joined a congressional delegation, led by Senator Norm Coleman and organized by the ONE Campaign, and visited Liberia and Ghana in 2012.

In July 2016, he testified before the Senate Foreign Relations Subcommittee on State Department and USAID Management, International Operations, and Bilateral International Development. He appeared, again, before the Senate's Subcommittee on Multilateral International Development, Multilateral Institutions, and International Economic Policy to discuss the issue of Global Philanthropy and Remittances and International Development. In November 2017, Runde also testified before the House Foreign Affairs Subcommittee on Asia and the Pacific, where he emphasized the role of development finance and U.S. federal agencies like United States Trade and Development Agency (USTDA) and Overseas Private Investment Corporation (OPIC) in securing American leadership in Asia. In the international space, Runde has testified before the Canadian Parliament’s Standing Committee on Foreign Affairs and International Development on the role of the private sector in achieving Canada's international development interests. He has also testified before the Australian Parliament, where he emphasized the role of Australia’s international development policy in the Asia Pacific region. He is a member of the Bretton Woods Committee.

Politics
Having served during the Bush Administration, Runde is very active in Republican politics. Runde served as a key foreign policy advisor and fundraiser for Governor Scott Walker’s 2016 Presidential Campaign. Runde serves as the chairperson for the international assistance working group within the John Hay Initiative (JHI), a network of foreign policy experts who have briefed or are advising many of the Republican candidates in the 2016 presidential election. In October 2011, Runde was named as member of Governor Mitt Romney’s Foreign Policy and National Security Advisory team as Co-Chair of Governor Romney’s International Assistance Working Group. He has also authored the international assistance chapter in the recently released JHI Book, Choosing to Lead: American Foreign Policy for a Disordered World. From 1999 to 2000, Runde chaired Republicans Abroad in Argentina.

Personal
Dan Runde is the son of James A. Runde (former partner of Morgan Stanley) and M. Barbara FitzGerald. Runde went to Dartmouth College, where he received his Bachelor of Arts (cum laude) in Government in 1994. He also received his Master of Public Policy from the Kennedy School of Government, Harvard University. He is married to Sonia Cavallo, the daughter of Domingo Cavallo, former Argentine Economy Minister and Foreign Minister. He and his wife have three sons.

References

External links
 

1972 births
American chief executives
American investors
American management consultants
American political writers
American male non-fiction writers
Businesspeople from Maryland
Businesspeople from Massachusetts
Harvard Kennedy School alumni
Living people
Maryland Republicans
American expatriates in Argentina